Otter Creek Township, Illinois may refer to one of the following townships:

 Otter Creek Township, Jersey County, Illinois
 Otter Creek Township, LaSalle County, Illinois

See also

Otter Creek Township (disambiguation)

Illinois township disambiguation pages